is a Japanese former footballer.

He played as a forward and defender. He is also the brother of Japan national team player, Seiichiro Maki and Japan Handball League Omron's European handball Team's Karina Maki.

Honours
 Japan University National Team (2005)

References

External links

1984 births
Living people
Komazawa University alumni
People from Uki, Kumamoto
Association football people from Kumamoto Prefecture
Japanese footballers
J1 League players
J2 League players
Nagoya Grampus players
Shonan Bellmare players
Association football forwards